Eugenio Francisco Reyes Morandé (born July 6, 1954, in Santiago) is a Chilean television, theatre and film actor.

He made his debut in the year 1989 in the series Sor Teresa de Los Andes on TVN. Notable performances include those with Chilean actress Claudia di Girolamo.  Francisco has married to Carmen Romero since 1987 and has five children. In 2007 he appeared in the TVN program El Baile and he won the competition.

In 2017 he gained international recognition for his role as Orlando, the older boyfriend of Marina (Daniela Vega) in Sebastián Lelio's Oscar-winning film A Fantastic Woman.

Filmography

Theatre 
 El Tony chico
  (1991–1992)
 Patas de perro 2000
 Enrique por Lhin 2001
 Eva Perón 2002
 El Campo 2004
 Dejála Sangrar 2005
 Copenhague 2006
 Criminal 2007
 Filotas 2007
 Pancho Villa 2008

References

1954 births
Chilean male film actors
Chilean male stage actors
Chilean male television actors
Chilean male telenovela actors
Chilean people of French descent
Living people
Male actors from Santiago
Colegio del Verbo Divino alumni